Bobby Jones Jr. may refer to:

Bobby Jones (golfer) (1902–1971), American lawyer and amateur golfer
Bobby Jones (basketball, born 1984) (born 1984), American professional basketball player
Robert Trent Jones Jr. (born 1939), golf course architect

See also
Bobby Jones (disambiguation)